"Ajax, Olé Olé Olé" is a Levenslied song by Willy Alberti sung with the Supporters of the Dutch association football club AFC Ajax from Amsterdam who were credited as the Ajax choir. The single was released on Philips Records in 1969. The song is the A-side to the record "Ajax, Olé Olé Olé / Hoi, Hoi, Hoi, (Je bent mijn glorie)" which was released as a 7"-single.

Willy Alberti also released other records relating to his favorite football club Ajax throughout his career, having released the single "We gaan naar Londen" two years later.

References

External links
 Willy Alberti's "Ajax Olé Olé Olé" on YouTube

AFC Ajax songs
1969 singles
Dutch pop songs
Dutch-language songs
Football songs and chants
1969 songs